Service may refer to:

Activities

 Administrative service, a required part of the workload of university faculty
 Civil service, the body of employees of a government
 Community service, volunteer service for the benefit of a community or a punishment that may be imposed by a court
 Fan service, a Japanese term referring to something which is specifically designed to entertain fans
 Military service, serving in a country's armed forces
 Feudal service, see Feudal land tenure in England
 Public service, services carried out with the aim of providing a public good
 Selfless service, a service which is performed without any expectation of result or award.

Arts, entertainment, and media
 Service (album), a 1983 album by Yellow Magic Orchestra
 Service (film), a 2008 film
 Service (play), a 1932 play by British writer Dodie Smith
 Service (record label), a Swedish record label
 "Service" (The Walking Dead), a 2016 television episode of The Walking Dead
 The Service, an 1840 essay by Henry David Thoreau

Economics and business
 Service (business), an aggregation of a service engagement with one or more service acts between two or more service systems creating service outcomes 
 Service (economics), the non-material equivalent of a good in economics and marketing, within a service–product continuum
 Service economy, which increases the integration of services in other sectors of the economy
 Service sector, the traditional tertiary sector of the economy, including:
 Customer service, provision of assistance to customers or clients
 Domestic service, employment in a residence
 Table service, food served by waiters and waitresses, also known as servers
 Service system, or customer service system (CSS), including:
 Service design
 Service management
 Services marketing
 Service contract (disambiguation), with various levels of management, relations or integration in a service system:
 Service-level agreement
 Managed services
 Outsourcing
 Service provider, third party or outsourced suppliers for organizations
 Motorway service area, also called services in the United Kingdom

Religion
 Church service, Christian communal worship, often held in a church building
 Divine Service (Lutheran), the public worship of Lutheran churches
 Service (music), musical settings for sections of a service of worship
 Service (Tenrikyo), the liturgy of the Tenrikyo religion
 Son of man came to serve, concerning Jesus
 Dharma, Buddhist doctrine of service and interconnectedness
 Bodhicitta and Bodhisattva, a form of servant leadership within Dharmic practice

Technology

Computing and telecommunications
 Service (systems architecture), the provision of a discrete function within a systems environment:
 Service layer, a conceptual layer within a network service provider architecture
 Service-oriented architecture (SOA), a design pattern in which application components provide services to other components via a communications protocol, typically over a network
 Service, the function provided by a server (computing)
 Service, local implementations in software:
 Service, a program in the services menu under macOS that processes selected data
 Daemon (computing), a background computer program in Unix
 Windows service, a background computer process belonging to no user in a Microsoft Windows system
 Network service
 Radiocommunication service, according to ITU Radio Regulations (RR) Article 1.19
 Telecommunications service, including:
 Internet Relay Chat services (IRC), a set of features implemented in most modern Internet Relay Chat networks
 Software as a service (SaaS)
 Web hosting service
 Web service, a software system to support interaction over a network
 Value-added service or content service provided by communication service provider (CSP), including:
 Services of an Intelligent Network (IN), for telecommunications
 GSM services

Other uses in technology
 Service (motor vehicle), maintenance procedures carried out after a vehicle has traveled a certain distance
 Building services engineering
 Penetrant (mechanical, electrical, or structural), as defined by a building code

Other uses
 A collection of matching tableware:
 Tea service
 Dinner service
 Cabaret service
 Servant leadership, leadership reconceptualized as service to those below
 Service (surname)
 Service, Missouri, a community in the United States
 Empire Service (1943–1961), one of the Empire ships in service of the British government
 Serve (tennis) or service, a shot to start a point in tennis
 Service High School, a public high school in Anchorage, Alaska
 Service of process, the delivery of a summons, complaint or other court petition
 Services (football team), an Indian club representing the Armed Services
 Sorbus domestica (Service Tree), a species of tree

See also
 Altruism, a principle or practice of caring for the welfare of others
 Goods and services
 Servant (disambiguation)
 Server (disambiguation)
 Volunteering, action taken to benefit others for no benefit to the one performing the action